Sultan Ibraahim, Sri dhanmaru Veeru Mahaa radhun was Sultan of the Maldives briefly in 1398 and again from 1412 to 1420. He was the eldest son of Sultan Hassan I of the Maldives. He ruled the country for four months in 1398 before abdicating in favour of his uncle Hussain.

After the death of Sultan Isa in 1412, Ibrahim regained the throne and ruled the country for 8 years and 8 months until his death in 1420.

See also
List of Sultans of the Maldives

14th-century births
1420 deaths
14th-century sultans of the Maldives
15th-century sultans of the Maldives